Brent Underwood is an American entrepreneur and owner of Cerro Gordo Mines.

Career
After graduating from Columbia University, Underwood worked briefly for an investment bank in New York City. After one month, he quit and backpacked across Central and South America. Upon returning to New York, he founded a hostel in Brooklyn. In December 2014 Underwood founded HK Austin, a hostel in Austin, Texas, with investors including Matthew Kepnes, after staying in 150 hostels across 30 countries. For 2015, HK Austin was the highest rated hostel in the United States.

Brass Check
Underwood later became a partner in the marketing firm Brass Check, with Ryan Holiday, Jimmy Soni and Nils Parker.

Putting My Foot Down
In February 2016, Underwood published a photo of his foot on Amazon as a book titled Putting My Foot Down. The purpose of the book was to show how few sales it took to become a "#1 Best Seller" on Amazon. The resulting article in the New York Observer received attention from a variety of media outlets including The New York Times, The Wall Street Journal, The Guardian, The Washington Post, The Los Angeles Times, and from authors including Neil Gaiman and Nick Bilton. Shortly after publication, Amazon removed the book citing quality issues. Underwood was then offered a publishing contract from Thought Catalog to turn Putting My Foot Down into an expanded paperback version. The paperback version received attention from Australia's breakfast television show Sunrise, VICE, Adweek, Business Insider, The Daily Dot, the Toronto Star, and others. Amazon later said they were changing their algorithm because of the stunt.

The Toronto Star recreated Underwood's stunt with their own fake book, which also reached #1 on Amazon's Best Seller list.

Cerro Gordo
In July 2018, Underwood purchased the former mining town of Cerro Gordo alongside the Cerro Gordo Mines for $1.4 million with a group of investors. The purchase included over 360 acres and 22 structures. Underwood stated plans to develop the town into an artist destination for tourists and group events, while maintaining the historic nature of the property.

Since March 2020, Underwood has been living at Cerro Gordo full-time and has regular visitors. Visitors have included Jeff Goldblum, Cole Sprouse, G-Eazy, and others. The town's hotel burned down on June 20, 2020, in a fire of undetermined origin but possibly electrical wiring failure, during a heat wave. Underwood has plans to rebuild it. He was isolated there for ten weeks in 2020, unable to leave due to the COVID-19 pandemic and a heavy snowstorm.

References

External links
 Official site

Living people
1987 births
American marketing people
Columbia University alumni
Florida State University alumni
Place of birth missing (living people)